
Gmina Ryńsk is a rural gmina (administrative district) in Wąbrzeźno County, Kuyavian-Pomeranian Voivodeship, in north-central Poland. The gmina derives its name from the village of Ryńsk, but its seat is the town of Wąbrzeźno (which is not part of the territory of the gmina).

Prior to 2017 the name of the gmina was Wąbrzeźno.

Village Names
Gmina Ryńsk contains the villages and settlements of Bugeria I, Bugeria II, Cymbark, Czystochleb, Frydrychowo, Jarantowice, Jarantowiczki, Jaworze, Katarzynki, Łabędź, Ludowice, Małe Radowiska, Michałki, Młynik, Myśliwiec, Nielub, Orzechówko, Orzechowo, Plebanka, Pływaczewo, Prochy, Przydwórz, Rozgard, Ryńsk, Sicinek, Sitno, Sosnówka, Stanisławki, Trzcianek, Trzciano, Wałycz, Wałyczyk, Węgorzyn, Wronie, Zaradowiska and Zieleń.

Neighbouring gminas
Gmina Ryńsk is bordered by the town of Wąbrzeźno and by the gminas of Chełmża, Dębowa Łąka, Kowalewo Pomorskie, Książki, Płużnica and Radzyń Chełmiński.

References
Polish official population figures 2006

Wabrzezno
Wąbrzeźno County